Daniel Gilkes (born 21 May 2002) is a motorcycle speedway rider from England.

Career
In 2019, he signed for the Kent Kings for the 2019 National Development League speedway season, helping them to National Trophy success. He was crowned the supporters rider of the year.

Unable to ride during 2020 because of the COVID-19 cancelled season, he continued to ride for Kent in 2021 but appeared in both the NDL and the higher league of the SGB Championship 2021.

In 2022, he signed for Plymouth Gladiators and his form was so impressive that he was added to the Peterborough Panthers squad in the SGB Premiership 2022 (the highest league in Britain).

He started the 2022 campaign in very good form but his season ended early when he crashed and suffered serious injuries that included five broken ribs, a broken and displaced humorous bone and a collapsed lung.

In 2023, he re-signed for Plymouth for the SGB Championship 2023 and also signed for Sheffield Tigers for the SGB Premiership 2023 as their rising star.

References 

2002 births
Living people
British speedway riders
Kent Kings riders
Peterborough Panthers riders
Plymouth Gladiators speedway riders
Sheffield Tigers riders